Symballophthalmus is a genus of hybotid dance flies, insects in the family Hybotidae. There are about eight described species in Symballophthalmus.

Species
These eight species belong to the genus Symballophthalmus:
 Symballophthalmus asiaticus Kovalev, 1977 c g
 Symballophthalmus dissimilis (Fallen, 1815) c g
 Symballophthalmus fuscitarsis (Zetterstedt, 1859) c g
 Symballophthalmus inermis Papp, 2003 c g
 Symballophthalmus masoni Chillcott, 1958 i c g b
 Symballophthalmus pictipes (Becker, 1889) c g
 Symballophthalmus speciosus Saigusa, 1963 c g
 Symballophthalmus viennai Raffone, 1986 c g
Data sources: i = ITIS, c = Catalogue of Life, g = GBIF, b = Bugguide.net

References

Hybotidae
Empidoidea genera
Articles created by Qbugbot